Whizziwig is a science fiction children's programme broadcast on CITV between 1998 and 2000 based on the books by award winning children's author Malorie Blackman.

Plot summary
Whizziwig centres on the adventures of a boy called Ben and his best friend Steve who befriends a small pink alien approximately the size of a rugby ball. Whizziwig has the ability to grant wishes to anyone who uttered the words "I wish..", however wishes had to be made for someone else and would last a maximum of 24 hours. A recurring theme is Ben and Steve trying to deceive their friend into granting their intentional wishes only for the alien to become wise to the scheme.

Ben would keep Whizziwig hidden, often smuggling her into school in his school bag. Many hilarious escapades ensued as the wishes made by unaware students in Whizziwigs earshot would be granted.

Cast
 Jenny Hutchinson - Whizziwig
 Kara Noble - Whizziwig
 Rebecca Nagan - Whizziwig
 Don Austen - Whizziwig Puppeteer
 Louis McKenzie - Ben Sinclair
 Matthew Barker - Steve Fleming
 Joan Oliver - Gina Sinclair
 Brian Bovell - Daniel Sinclair
 Mona Hammond - Auntie Dottie
 Nimmy March - Lizzie Sinclair
 Tyler Butterworth - Mr. Archer
 Martin Arrowsmith - Steve "Slippery" Sloper
 Colin Prockter - Mayor
 Andre Mahjouri - Paul
 Ebony Francis - Jennifer
 Catherine Barr - Paula
 Brian Trump - The Underwear Snatcher
 Kaefan Shaw and Anthony Asbury - Archie the Parrot
 Glen Kinch - Budgie
 Douglas Fielding - Foreman
 Anna Gilbert - Mrs. Morton
 Yvonne Marlowe - Woman In Park
 Sheila Halse - Woman In Street
 Natasha Lee - Jessica
 Melissa Simpson - Katie
 Sue Cleaver - Inspector Pascal
 Richard Trinder - P.C. Reid
 Anna Winkles - Caitlin

References

External links
 

British children's science fiction television series
British television shows featuring puppetry
ITV children's television shows
Television series about extraterrestrial life